Barwidgee Station is a pastoral lease that operates as a sheep station in Western Australia. 

The Ryan brothers sold the property in 1944 to L. Bilston, who had managed the station for the previous five years. There were sixty mills connected to tanks, a five-stand shearing shed, two wool sheds and a compact homestead. It was stocked with 7,000 sheep, 100 cattle and 30 horses.

In 1950 the property was stocked with 9,500 sheep.

Mega Uranium acquired the  lease in 2009. Mega's Lake Maitland uranium mine is located on the lease.

See also
List of ranches and stations
List of pastoral leases in Western Australia

References

Pastoral leases in Western Australia
Stations (Australian agriculture)
Homesteads in Western Australia
Mid West (Western Australia)